John Flournoy Montgomery (September 20, 1878 – November 7, 1954) was an American businessman and diplomat. His sole diplomatic posting was as U.S. Minister to Hungary, between 1933 and 1941. This ambassadorial assignment placed Montgomery at the center of the seething intrigue and gathering storm that characterized 1930's Hungary and Central Europe; in particular he was witness to the rise of Adolf Hitler's influence in Budapest, and the complex struggle over the alliance between Hungary and Nazi Germany. His memoirs, entitled Hungary: The Unwilling Satellite, are considered a valuable document of that era.

Background
Montgomery was a native of Missouri, born September 20, 1878 in the town of Sedalia and educated there.  At the age of 26, he married Hedwig Wildi, and the couple had two daughters.  Montgomery built a successful career in the dairy industry, specifically in the processing of condensed milk.  From 1925 to 1933, he was the president of the International Milk Company in Vermont.  He was a loyal and generous supporter of the Democratic Party, and after Democrat Franklin D. Roosevelt claimed the White House in 1932, Montgomery was rewarded with the promise of a diplomatic job.

Budapest posting
In June 1933, Montgomery was sworn in as U.S. Minister to Hungary (he had hoped to be sent to Vienna, but Budapest was what he was offered).  Montgomery was clearly expected to watch over the political intrigues not only in Budapest but, from his central location on the Danube, to monitor the goings-on in Hungary's neighbors (Austria,  Czechoslovakia, Romania, Yugoslavia) and other countries in the region as well, including Bulgaria,  Poland, Germany and Italy.  Roosevelt invited Montgomery to report to him personally, an opportunity the ambassador took occasionally.

Although he had no career experience as an international diplomat, Montgomery proved to be an enthusiastic and dedicated ambassador.  He cultivated hundreds of friendships among the Hungarian and European political class, with whom he socialized regularly; he faithfully dictated records of almost every conversation he held with important political players, and kept a detailed journal.  He avidly collected and recorded information about his many contacts, including their earlier jobs, their families and hobbies, and even gossip he heard about them from his other friends.

At the same time, Montgomery was hindered by his background: he spoke only English, which limited most of his meaningful contacts to those Hungarians and other Europeans who had studied English themselves and spoke it fluently.  By definition, this meant that most of his close relationships in Budapest were with educated aristocrats and members of the ruling political elite.  His inability to read local newspapers or understand casual conversations in the street meant that Montgomery was cut off from much of the middle- and working-class political activity in the Hungarian capital.

Montgomery was also plainly charmed by Budapest's Gilded Age atmosphere, and enchanted by the capital's old-world pageantry – the elaborate costumes and glittering, semi-feudal rituals to which Hungary clung.  In particular, he was won over by the considerable charisma and personal charm of Hungary's head of state, the regent Miklós Horthy.

Montgomery and the rise of Hitler
Unquestionably the most critical trend which Montgomery was required to monitor from Budapest was the rise of Adolf Hitler and the Nazi regime in Germany - and Hitler's growing influence in Hungarian political circles.  Like many American diplomats, Montgomery was suspicious of Hitler from early in the dictator's reign; the ambassador's scathing reports on Hitler delighted FDR, who shared his contempt for the German dictator.

The Hungarian leadership was aware of American hostility toward Hitler's Nazi regime; as Hungary crept deeper into Hitler's sphere of influence throughout the 1930s, Horthy and his colleagues took pains to assure Montgomery that they, too, disliked and feared Hitler – a message which Montgomery dutifully passed back to Washington, as they doubtless hoped he would.

What Hungary's various leaders actually thought of Hitler and alliance with Germany is the subject of a complex debate that lasts to the present day.  Hungary had its own home-grown fascist movements and right-wing politicians, and anti-Semitism was embedded in Hungarian culture, but much of the political elite in Budapest was genuinely wary of Hitler.  The German Fuehrer was generally seen as a useful but dangerous ally: he clearly had his own designs on Hungary's natural resources, and after the 1938 Anschluss, Hitler had a well-equipped army standing directly on Hungary's borders.  At the same time, Horthy was hoping to make use of Hitler: the regent, like most of the political class, was virulently anti-Communist, and he was gambling that Hitler would keep Hungary safe from the dangers posed by Joseph Stalin's "Asiatic barbarians."  Horthy was also dedicated (as was virtually every Hungarian) to re-acquiring territories which Hungary had been forced to cede to neighboring nations at the end of the First World War - and some of which were re-annexed by Hungary with Hitler's help between 1938 and 1940.

Nevertheless, Montgomery's Hungarian friends convinced him that Hungary's capitulations to the Nazis were essentially pragmatic, the only possible path for a weak nation facing a well-armed and ruthless neighbor.  As Montgomery wrote in Hungary: The Unwilling Satellite:

In this, Montgomery echoed the stance of the regent Horthy, who wrote in his own memoirs:

This similarity of opinion is not unusual: a comparison of Horthy's memoirs and Montgomery's yields a regular alignment of their views, especially regarding Hungary's political choices before and during the Second World War.

The friendship between the two men was cemented during a famous episode on March 15, 1939.  Both men were attending a gala performance at the Budapest Opera House, when supporters of the fascist Hungarian Ferenc Szálasi (recently jailed on Horthy's order) disrupted the opening ceremonies by chanting, from a box above the regent's, "Justice for Szálasi!"  Horthy, enraged, dashed out of his royal box, and Montgomery followed to see what was happening.  When he caught up with Horthy, he reported that:

Horthy apparently believed that Montgomery was coming to offer help, because he thanked Montgomery later with a gift of a photograph of the opera event, a present which Montgomery treasured.  The two men became close (according to Tibor Frank, a Hungarian scholar who closely studied Montgomery's private papers, Montgomery even shared Horthy's "drawing-room anti-Semitism," and viewed the pre-war anxieties of Budapest's large Jewish upper-middle class with a mixture of sympathy and condescension).  Montgomery did his best to foster a sense of personal connection between the regent and President Roosevelt – a connection which Horthy apparently felt, but which Roosevelt did not.  On the whole, Montgomery resented the way in which Roosevelt held him at arm's length, and complained that FDR was insufficiently curious about real reports from the field.

After Budapest
Montgomery was recalled from his posting Budapest in March 1941, three months before Hungary finally joined the Axis as a full war partner during the invasion of the Soviet Union.  When the United States entered the Second World War that December, Horthy's alliance with Hitler placed the minister's beloved Hungary in America's enemies column; but Montgomery remained committed to Hungary's independence and well-being.  He viewed with anguish the destruction of virtually half the capital during the Battle of Budapest, and he bitterly mourned the ceding of Hungary to Soviet control at the war's end.

Montgomery also remained committed to the well-being of Miklós Horthy, who was captured by American troops at the war's end: as the Allies prepared for the Nuremberg Trials, Montgomery used his influence in Washington to help extricate Horthy from indictment and trial.  Horthy was interviewed extensively, and later was called to testify at the trial of a Nazi administrator in Budapest, but was never charged for any of his actions during or before the war.

After the trials, Montgomery continued to support the Horthys in their exile (they could not and would not return to Budapest, which was now controlled by a Soviet-led Communist government).  After the Horthy family relocated to Estoril, Portugal, Montgomery raised funds for their upkeep from a small committee of wealthy Hungarians in America.  After Montgomery died in 1954, his daughter Jean continued supporting the ex-regent and his wife until their deaths.

In 1947 Montgomery published a heartfelt memoir of his Budapest days called Hungary: The Unwilling Satellite.  The book was, and remains, a widely read and widely quoted source for examinations of Hungarian pre-war politics, in some measure because it is unique as a thorough Western lens on interwar Hungary; the Soviet-dominated Hungarian leadership after 1947 vilified Horthy and promoted an official view that Horthy was a fascist and a Nazi collaborator.

The stories Montgomery told in The Unwilling Satellite were further illuminated by the discovery, among Montgomery's personal papers, of his own private notes on many of his discussions with Hungary's leaders.  These notes were found by scholar Tibor Frank after he met Montgomery's daughter Jean, and was given unconstrained access by her to the Montgomery papers.  Frank published many of these notes in the book he wrote based on them: Discussing Hitler: Advisors of U.S. Diplomacy in Central Europe, 1934-1941.

Notes

Ambassadors of the United States to Hungary
American food industry business executives
1878 births
1954 deaths